Made in Hollywood is an entertainment-focused television series hosted by Kylie Erica Mar and Julie L. Harkness airing in syndication on September 30, 2005 which generally features press junket interviews with Hollywood actors and musicians to promote current and upcoming films and albums.

Teen Edition
Made in Hollywood has a spin-off series, Made in Hollywood: Teen Edition, which is hosted by Mar only, and mainly focuses on young entertainers than its parent program, along with detailed 'behind the scenes' looks at aspects at the film industry which meets a certain curriculum. Since the show is targeted to ages 13 to 16 specifically due to that content, it is designed to meet the FCC's E/I guidelines and allow stations E/I credit for airing it.

References

External links 

2005 American television series debuts
2006 American television series debuts
2010s American television talk shows
English-language television shows
First-run syndicated television programs in the United States
2020s American television talk shows